The fifth edition of the Women's Asian Amateur Boxing Championships were held from May 24 to May 30, 2010 in Astana, Kazakhstan.

Medalists

Medal table

References
amateur-boxing

Asian Amateur Boxing Championships